The women's team archery competition at the 2012 Olympic Games in London was held from 27 to 29 July at Lord's Cricket Ground.

The gold medal was won by South Korea. This was the third consecutive Olympics that China lost to South Korea in the final. Japan won the bronze medal over Russia.

Competition format
The teams were ranked 1st to 12th based on the three team members' ranking round results and this was used to seed the teams into a head-to-head knockout bracket. Each member of the team shot eight arrows in a match (for a total of 24 arrows per team) and the team with the highest total won the match. The winner advanced to the next round while the loser was eliminated from the competition.

Schedule

All times are British Summer Time (UTC+1).

Records
Prior to this competition, the existing world and Olympic records were as follows.

216 arrow ranking round

24 arrow match

Results

Ranking round

Competition bracket

References

Archery at the 2012 Summer Olympics
2012 in women's archery
Women's events at the 2012 Summer Olympics